Operation Magic Carpet was the post-World War II operation by the War Shipping Administration to repatriate over eight million American military personnel from the European, Pacific, and Asian theaters. Hundreds of Liberty ships, Victory ships, and troop transports began repatriating soldiers from Europe in June 1945. Beginning in October 1945, over 370 navy ships were used for repatriation duties in the Pacific. Warships, such as aircraft carriers, battleships, hospital ships, and large numbers of assault transports were used. The European phase of Operation Magic Carpet concluded in February 1946 while the Pacific phase continued until September 1946.

Planning 
As early as mid-1943, the United States Army had recognized that, once the war was over, bringing the troops home would be a priority. More than 16 million Americans were in uniform, and more than eight million of them were scattered across all theaters of war worldwide. Army Chief of Staff General George Marshall established committees to address the logistical problem. Eventually organization of the operation was given to the War Shipping Administration (WSA). Eligibility for repatriation was determined by the Adjusted Service Rating Score.

Europe 
The Navy was excluded from the initial European sealift, as the Pacific War was far from over, and the task of returning the troops was the sole responsibility of the Army and Merchant Marine. The WSA ordered the immediate conversion of 300 Liberty and Victory cargo ships into transports. Adequate port and docking facilities were also serious considerations along with the transportation necessary to take the veterans to demobilization camps after they reached America's shores.

There were 3,059,000 service men and women in Europe, Africa and the Mediterranean on VE-Day. The first homeward-bound ships left Europe in late June 1945, and by November, the sealift was at its height. Whereas American shipping had averaged the delivery of 148,000 soldiers per month to the European Theater of Operations (ETO) during the wartime build-up, the post VE-Day rush homeward would average more than 435,000 GIs per month for the next 14 months.

In mid-October 1945 the United States Navy donated the newly commissioned carrier —fitted with bunks for 3,300 troops—to the operation. She was joined in November by the battleship . The European lift now included more than 400 vessels. Some would carry as few as 300 while the large ocean liners often squeezed 15,000 aboard. One of the ocean liners, the British , the U.S. obtained the use of in exchange for 10 smaller U.S. vessels. The WSA and the army also converted 29 troopships into special carriers for war brides, for the almost half a million European women who had married American servicemen. The Magic Carpet fleet also included 48 hospital ships; these transported more than half a million wounded.

This was not, however, a one-way stream. Former Axis POWs had to be repatriated from Europe and Japan and occupation forces had to be dropped in Germany, China, Korea and Japan. Returned to Europe were more than 450,000 German prisoners of war, in addition to 53,000 Italian ex-POWs. Between May and September 1945, 1,417,850 were repatriated.

Between October 1945 to April 1946, another 3,323,395 were repatriated. By the end of February, the ETO phase of Magic Carpet was essentially completed.

Asia and the Pacific 

With the surrender of Japan, the navy also began bringing home Sailors and Marines. Stopping at Okinawa, they embarked thousands more Tenth United States Army troops.

The Navy hastily converted many of its warships into temporary transports, including aircraft carriers, where three-to five-tiered bunks were installed on the hangar decks to provide accommodation for several thousand men in relative comfort. The Navy fleet of 369 ships included 222 assault transports, 6 battleships, 18 cruisers, 57 aircraft carriers and 12 hospital ships.

By October 1945, Magic Carpet was operating worldwide with the Army, Navy and WSA pooling their resources to expedite the troop-lift. December 1945 became the peak month with almost 700,000 returning home from the Pacific. With the final arrival of 29 troop transports carrying more than 200,000 soldiers and sailors from the China-Burma-India theater in April 1946, Operation Magic Carpet came to its end. The last of the troops to return from the Pacific war zone (127,300) arrived home in September 1946.

Airlift 
The Army's Air Transport Command (ATC) and the navy's Naval Air Transport Service (NATS) were also involved in Magic Carpet operations, amassing millions of flying hours in transport and cargo aircraft, though the total number of personnel returned home by aircraft was minuscule in comparison to the numbers carried by ship.

See also 
 Demobilization of United States armed forces after World War II

Notes

Citations

Bibliography 
 

1945 in the United States
1946 in the United States
Non-combat military operations involving the United States
United States Marine Corps in the 20th century